Novy Kondal is a rural locality (a selo) in Gromkovskoye Rural Settlement, Rudnyansky District, Volgograd Oblast, Russia. The population was 104 as of 2010. There are 3 streets.

Geography 
Novy Kondal is located in steppe, 44 km southwest of Rudnya (the district's administrative centre) by road. Gromki is the nearest rural locality.

References 

Rural localities in Rudnyansky District, Volgograd Oblast